Avoca is an unincorporated community and census-designated place in Marshall Township, Lawrence County, Indiana, United States. As of the 2010 census the population was 583.

History
Avoca was platted in 1819. The community likely took its name after the River Avoca, which was mentioned in a poem by Thomas Moore. The Avoca post office was established in 1856.

Geography
Indiana State Road 37 runs along the eastern edge of the community, leading north  to Bloomington and south  to Bedford, the Lawrence county seat. State Road 58 passes through the center of Avoca, joining SR 37 southbound but leading west  to Owensburg. State Road 54 has its eastern terminus at SR 37 and leads northwest  to Bloomfield.

The community is in the valley of Goose Creek, which flows southeast to Salt Creek, part of the White River watershed.

Avoca Park

The Avoca State Fish Hatchery was built in 1819 and first served as a grist mill until 1919, when it was purchased by the DNR, who began building ponds in 1923. The Hatchery stocked Indiana's waters with fish for years until it was decommissioned by the DNR in 2013 and fell into disrepair. Bedford Mayor Shawna Girgis asked Bedford Park Director, Barry Jeskewich, to restore this historical location for Lawrence County. Barry Jeskewich partnered with James Farmer, Indiana University Substaining Hoosier Communities to obtained a grant to preserve this beloved green space for the surrounding community.
Avoca State Fish Hatchery was renamed Avoca Park and Recreation and is now in the hands of the local community.

Demographics

References

Sources
“IU Farmer-Jeskewich Final Report”

Footnotes

Irish-American culture in Indiana
Census-designated places in Lawrence County, Indiana
Census-designated places in Indiana